Behnam Afsheh (born 3 April 1983) is a former Iranian professional footballer.

Career
Afsheh was part of Pegah Gilan until 2008. When Pegah dissolved, he joined a new team, Damash, for one season and scored Damash's first goal against Fajr Sepasi on 17 September 2008. By the end of the season, Damash was relegated to the Azadegan League and Afsheh moved to Moghavemat. He moved back to Damash Gilan in the summer of 2010. He was released by Damash in December 2012. He joined Azadegan League side Mes Sarcheshmeh in January 2013.

Club career statistics
Last Update  3 March 2014

References

External sources
 Profile at Persianleague

Living people
1983 births
Iranian footballers
Pegah Gilan players
Damash Gilan players
Fajr Sepasi players
Association football midfielders